Berehove is a city located in Zakarpattia Oblast (province) in western Ukraine, near the border with Hungary. It is the cultural centre of the Hungarian minority in Ukraine.

Name
The city has many different variations of spelling its name: ,  (translit. Berehovo),  (translit. Beregovo),  (Łacinka Bierahava), Czech and Slovak: Berehovo, .

Residents of Berehovo voted on October 31, 2010, in a referendum on renaming the town to Beregszász, its Hungarian-language name. Voter turnout was less than 52%, with 4,688 voting for renaming, 4,358 against, and 1,016 invalid ballots.

Administrative division
Part of the city is also a near adjacent village of Zatyshne of 504 people that has its representation in the city's council.

Hungarian has been made a regional language in Berehovo in September 2012; meaning it will now be used in the town's administrative office work and documents. This was made possible after new legislation on languages in Ukraine was passed in the summer of 2012.

Climate
Berehove has an oceanic climate (Köppen: Cfb).

History

In 1910, out of 12,933 inhabitants 12,432 were Hungarians (96.1%), 221 Ukrainians (Ruthenians) and 140 Germans.

It was the capital of the Kingdom of Hungary's Bereg County until 1920 and between 1940 and 1945.

From 1920 until 1938 it was part of Czechoslovakia. Prior to World War II, the city had a significant Jewish population, estimated at 8,000 persons.  Only four returned following the war.

A local newspaper has been published here since December 1945.

In January 1989 the population was 30,157 people.

In 2001, ethnic groups included:
 48.1% Hungarians 12.8 thousand
 38.9% Ukrainians 10.3 thousand
 6.4% Romani people 1.7 thousand
 5.4% Russians 1.5 thousand

The first Hungarian-language college in Ukraine is in Berehovo, the II. Rákoczi Ferenc College.

Notable citizens
Rabbi Hugo Gryn (1930–1996) was born here on June 25, 1930, and became well known as a broadcaster in Britain.
 The parents of Nobel Prize–winning economist Milton Friedman lived there before emigrating to the United States.
Julius Rebek (born April 11, 1944), American chemist and expert on molecular self-assembly was born here.
Csaba Czébely (born December 3, 1975), the drummer of Hungarian heavy metal band Pokolgép.
Géza Kalocsay (born May 30, 1913, died September 26, 2008), former Hungarian and Czechoslovak footballer, football manager e.g. Standard Liège, FK Partizan, Górnik Zabrze.
Aranka Siegal (born June 10, 1930) is a writer, Holocaust survivor, and recipient of the Newbery Honor and Boston Globe-Horn Book Award, both awarded to her in 1982.
Michael Moskowitz (born December 22, 1951), Ukrainian-American analytical chemist and translator. 
Andrea Bocskor  (born August 11, 1978), politician who in the 2014 European Parliament election in Hungary was elected into the European Parliament. Hence, Bocskor became the first elected Ukrainian citizen in the European Parliament.
Hungarian voice actor  was born in Berehove.
Sári Fedák (1879–1955), Hungarian actress and singer was born here.
Alen Panov (1978), Ukrainian diplomat, lawyer and professor of Uzhhorod National University

International relations

Twin towns — Sister cities
Berehove is twinned with:

 Przeworsk, Poland
 Satu Mare, Romania
 Gödöllő, Hungary
 Maassluis, Netherlands

See also
Great Synagogue, Berehove

References

External links

 City of Berehove official website (Ukrainian)
 City of Bereghovo official website (English Version)
 Berehove in the Encyclopedia of Ukraine
 Berehove - Shtetlink

Cities in Zakarpattia Oblast
Shtetls
Cities of regional significance in Ukraine
Holocaust locations in Ukraine
Hungarian communities